The Regulatory Reform Committee was a select committee of the House of Commons in the Parliament of the United Kingdom. The remit of the committee was to examine subordinate provisions to amend primary legislation as created under the Deregulation and Contracting Out Act 1994, amended by the Regulatory Reform Act 2001. It ceased to exist on 20 May 2021, with responsibilities being transferred to the Business, Energy and Industrial Strategy Committee.

Membership
At dissolution, the members of the committee were as follows:

Source: Reform Committee

2017–2019 Parliament
Members were announced on 6 November 2017.

Changes 2017–2019

2015–2017 Parliament
Members were announced on 12 October 2015.

Changes 2015–2017

2010–2015 Parliament
Members were announced on 26 July 2010.

Changes 2010–2015

See also
List of Committees of the United Kingdom Parliament

References

External links
Regulatory Reform Committee

Select Committees of the British House of Commons